Martina Heinlein (born 16 May 1981 in Starnberg) is a German field hockey player who competed in the 2008 Summer Olympics.

References

External links
 

1981 births
Living people
German female field hockey players
Olympic field hockey players of Germany
Field hockey players at the 2008 Summer Olympics
People from Starnberg
Sportspeople from Upper Bavaria
20th-century German women
21st-century German women